Charles Courant (14 April 1896 – 26 June 1982) was a Swiss freestyle wrestler and Olympic medalist. He competed at the 1920 Summer Olympics in Antwerp where he won a silver medal.
He won a bronze medal at the 1924 Summer Olympics in Paris.

References

1896 births
1982 deaths
Swiss wrestlers
Wrestlers at the 1920 Summer Olympics
Wrestlers at the 1924 Summer Olympics
Swiss male sport wrestlers
Olympic silver medalists for Switzerland
Olympic bronze medalists for Switzerland
Olympic medalists in wrestling
Medalists at the 1920 Summer Olympics
Medalists at the 1924 Summer Olympics